406th may refer to:

406th Air Expeditionary Group, the operational flying component of the 406th Air Expeditionary Wing
406th Air Expeditionary Wing, a provisional unit assigned to the United States Air Forces in Europe
406th Bombardment Squadron or 906th Air Refueling Squadron (906 ARS), part of the 375th Air Mobility Wing at Scott Air Force Base, Illinois
406th Support Brigade (United States), support brigade of the United States Army

See also
406 (number)
406 (disambiguation)
406, the year 406 (CDVI) of the Julian calendar
406 BC